Hannah Burchell (born 25 February 1995) is an Australian rules footballer  who played for Geelong and Richmond in the AFL Women's competition (AFLW). She played one game with Geelong in the 2019 season before being delisted by the club and moving to Richmond as a delisted free agent.

Early life and state-league football
Burchell spent her formative years in Ocean Grove, a seaside town 23 kilometres outside Geelong.

She played VFLW football with Geelong in 2017 and 2018.

AFL Women's career
Burchell was signed by Geelong as a pre-listed free agent in August 2018.

She made her AFLW debut during round 7 of the 2019 season in a match against  at UNSW Canberra Oval. She was omitted from the Geelong side that played in a losing preliminary final the following week. At season's end she was delisted by Geelong, having played just one AFLW match. Burchell joined expansion club Richmond as delisted free agent later that month.

In December 2022, Burchell was delisted by Richmond after spending AFL Women's season seven on the injury list.

Statistics
Statistics are correct to round 2, 2022.

|- style="background-color: #eaeaea"
! scope="row" style="text-align:center" | 2019
|style="text-align:center;"|
| 3 || 1 || 0 || 0 || 6 || 2 || 8 || 2 || 1 || 0.0 || 0.0 || 6.0 || 2.0 || 8.0 || 2.0 || 1.0
|-
! scope="row" style="text-align:center" | 2020
|  || 9 || 6 || 0 || 0 || 24 || 14 || 38 || 10 || 8 || 0.0 || 0.0 || 4.0 || 2.3 || 6.3 || 1.7 || 1.3
|- style="background:#EAEAEA"
| scope="row" text-align:center | 2021
| || 9 || 8 || 0 || 1 || 47 || 28 || 75 || 21 || 14 || 0.0 || 0.1 || 5.9 || 3.5 || 9.4 || 2.6 || 1.8
|-
| scope="row" text-align:center | 2022
| 
| 9 || 2 || 0 || 0 || 8 || 8 || 16 || 1 || 1 || 0.0 || 0.0 || 4.0 || 4.0 || 8.0 || 0.5 || 0.5
|-
|- class="sortbottom"
! colspan=3| Career
! 34
! 0
! 1
! 85
! 52
! 137
! 34
! 24
! 0.0
! 0.1
! 5.0
! 3.1
! 8.1
! 2.0
! 1.4
|}

References

External links

  
 

Geelong Football Club (AFLW) players
1995 births
Living people
Australian rules footballers from Victoria (Australia)
Sportswomen from Victoria (Australia)
Richmond Football Club (AFLW) players